Tomcat (also known as F14 Tomcat ) is a video game published in 1989 in the UK by Players Software. The game was released on the Acorn Electron, BBC Micro, Commodore 16, Commodore Plus/4, Commodore 64, Amstrad CPC, and ZX Spectrum as a budget title. It was also on a Your Sinclair magazine cover tape. Tomcat is a vertically scrolling shooter in which the player takes control of an F14 Tomcat fighter aircraft, shooting at both air and ground targets whilst flying over four levels.

Plot

The game is set in the future, some time after the first half of the 21st century. Materials science has progressed such that human civilisation has found a way to cheaply build many artificial islands. The game is set on one such island, called ARTROCK 6 which is a completely automated defence installation. Due to a freak storm damaging the controlling software, the island has turned against its own side and has started attacking local shipping. The player's task is to fly in and completely destroy the rogue island.

Reception

Reviews are generally negative, citing a slow running speed, an overly high difficulty level and a lack of originality. Reviewers independently agree that the game has a major flaw in that the enemy bullets are incredibly difficult to see, being the same colour as the background graphics in many versions. The game has also been criticised for having a weak aeroplane theme as it's simply a fixed-speed vertical scroller which could just as easily have a spaceship or any such sprite in its place.

The game scored 24% in Crash magazine.

References

External links
 Gamebase 64 entry for Tomcat, showing Commodore 64 screenshot
 Commodore 16 / Commodore Plus/4 screenshot at plus4world
 YouTube video featuring Commodore 64 chip-music from Tomcat by Jeroen Tel
Another Commodore 64 screenshot and details of the game

1989 video games
Amstrad CPC games
BBC Micro and Acorn Electron games
Commodore 16 and Plus/4 games
Commodore 64 games
Vertically scrolling shooters
Video games developed in the United Kingdom
ZX Spectrum games